Ignite the Dream: A Nighttime Spectacular of Magic and Light was a nighttime spectacular at Shanghai Disneyland Park in the Shanghai Disney Resort. Ignite the Dream unfolds on the park's castle, Enchanted Storybook Castle, similar to other hybrid-nighttime castle shows found at other Disney parks, including: Disney Illuminations at Disneyland Paris for the 25th Anniversary edition. The show features fireworks, water fountains, fire, lasers, projection mapping, and searchlights. The show’s story is centered on Mickey Mouse flying through the evening sky after discovering a magical spark that ignites his imagination.

Show summary 
Mickey Mouse unleashed a spark of imagination, allowing him to journey across several Disney films. Mickey is transported to three scenes from The Lion King. Mickey splashes down a waterfall that transports him underwater and into the sea, where he encounters Ariel from The Little Mermaid. The scenery transitions into the Great Barrier Reef from Finding Nemo, where Mickey is swept up into the waves of the East Australian Current. The waves lead him to a sunken pirate ship, where Mickey opens a treasure chest and uncovers a cursed Aztec coin. The disembodied voice from Pirates of the Caribbean is heard and a battle siege led by Jack Sparrow unfolds. Mickey is then taken to the Cave of Wonders from Aladdin, where he upons the Genie, who performs "Friend Like Me". The sequence is followed by a montage of Mulan. The balloons from Up appear across the castle, carrying Mickey high above into the stars as the Millennium Falcon flies across the castle and enters a frenetic space battle from Star Wars. Following that, the show depicts a climactic scene from Frozen with Elsa and Anna. The show then concludes with a finale featuring a montage of scenes from the previously represented Disney films as well as Beauty and the Beast, Sleeping Beauty, Snow White and the Seven Dwarfs, The Princess and the Frog, Cars, Toy Story, Zootopia, Monsters Inc., Tangled, and Big Hero 6.

Soundtrack 
 A Dream Is a Wish Your Heart Makes (from Cinderella) (Mack David / Al Hoffman / Jerry Livingston)
 Circle of Life, I Just Can't Wait to Be King, Hakuna Matata (from The Lion King) (Elton John / Tim Rice)
 Part of Your World (from The Little Mermaid) (Alan Menken / Howard Ashman)
 Fronds Like These, The Turtle Lope (from Finding Nemo) (Thomas Newman)
 He's a Pirate (from Pirates of the Caribbean) (Klaus Badelt / Hans Zimmer)
 Friend Like Me (from Aladdin) (Alan Menken / Howard Ashman)
 Reflection, I'll Make a Man Out of You (from Mulan) (Matthew Wilder / David Zippel)
 When You Wish Upon A Star (from Pinocchio) (Leigh Harline / Ned Washington)
 Main Title, March of the Resistance (from Star Wars / Star Wars: The Force Awakens) (John Williams)
 Let it Go, For the First Time in Forever (from Frozen) (Robert Lopez / Kristen-Anderson Lopez)
 Transformation (from Beauty and the Beast) (Alan Menken)
 A Dream Is a Wish Your Heart Makes (from Cinderella) (Mack David / Al Hoffman / Jerry Livingston)

See also 
 Disney Dreams!
 Disney Illuminations
 Happily Ever After
 Once Upon a Time
 Disneyland Forever
 Remember... Dreams Come True and Celebrate! Tokyo Disneyland
 Disney in the Stars and Fantasy in the Sky
 Wishes: A Magical Gathering of Disney Dreams and Celebrate the Magic
 Believe... There's Magic in the Stars and Believe... In Holiday Magic

References

Amusement park attractions that closed in 2021
Amusement park attractions introduced in 2016
Walt Disney Parks and Resorts entertainment
Shanghai Disneyland
Walt Disney Parks and Resorts fireworks